Saurabh Sharma (born 30 December 1997) is an Indian badminton player. He has represented India in BWF International tournaments, having won multiple mixed doubles and men's doubles tournaments. He also became the U-19 Mixed doubles champion in the junior nationals.

Background 
Sharma spent the early years of his life in Sonipat in Haryana. He started playing badminton at the age of eight and in 2009 he joined the Gopichand Badminton Academy for training.

Career 
In 2016, Sharma and Parikh won the Nepal International after defeating Venkat Gaurav Prasad and Juhi Dewangan in the final.

In 2017, Sharma and Parikh were runners-up in the Kharkiv International and South Africa International. In 2018, the pair reached the final of the Brazil International but were defeated by Russian pair of Evgenij Dremin of Evgenia Dimova.

Sharma and Parikh won the Kharkiv title in 2018 after they defeated the Polish pair of Paweł Śmiłowski of Magdalena Świerczyńska.

In the Men's doubles category he won the South Africa International in 2017, Jamaica International in 2018 and the Nepal International in 2019.

Achievements

BWF International Challenge/Series 
Men's doubles

Mixed doubles

  BWF International Challenge tournament
  BWF International Series tournament
  BWF Future Series tournament

External links 
 Official website
 
 Saurabh Sharma on Instagram
Saurabh Sharma on Twitter

References 

1997 births
Living people
Indian male badminton players